Březina (feminine Březinová) is a Czech surname and toponym. It may refer to:

People
David Březina, Czech footballer
Eliška Březinová, Czech figure skater
Jan Březina, Czech politician
Michal Březina, Czech figure skater
Otokar Březina, Czech poet

Places
Březina (former Blansko District), a municipality and village in the South Moravian Region
Březina (Jičín District), a municipality and village in the Hradec Králové Region
Březina (Jindřichův Hradec District), a municipality and village in the South Bohemian Region
Březina (Mladá Boleslav District), a municipality and village in the Central Bohemian Region
Březina (Rokycany District), a municipality and village in the Plzeň Region
Březina (Svitavy District), a municipality and village in the Pardubice Region
Březina (former Tišnov District), a municipality and village in the South Moravian Region
Březina, a village and part of Hořepník in the Vysočina Region
Březina, a village and part of Luká in the Olomouc Region
Březina, a village and part of Nové Sady (Vyškov District) in the South Moravian Region
Březina, a village and part of Vlastějovice in the Central Bohemian Region
Březina, a military training area in the South Moravian Region

See also
Brezina (disambiguation)

Czech-language surnames